Hodgesiella is a genus of moth in the family Cosmopterigidae.

Species
Hodgesiella callistrepta (Meyrick, 1917)
Hodgesiella christophi Koster & Sinev, 2003
Hodgesiella lampropeda (Meyrick, 1917)
Hodgesiella puplesisi  Sinev, 1989 
Hodgesiella quagella (Christoph, 1887)
Hodgesiella rebeli (Krone, 1905)
Hodgesiella rhodorrhisella (Kasy, 1970)

References
Natural History Museum Lepidoptera genus database
Hodgesiella at funet

Cosmopteriginae